Atheris matildae, also known as Matilda's horned viper, is a species of arboreal forest viper endemic to Tanzania.

Discovery
It was discovered in the Southern Highlands of Tanzania during a 2010–2011 biological survey. The exact location of the viper is unspecified, to protect it from being collected for the illegal pet trade. The snake was described as a new species on December 6, 2011, in a study published in the journal, Zootaxa. A captive breeding colony has already been established by the authors of the study.

Behavior
The species is most likely a nocturnal ambush predator, waiting by streams to ambush frogs.

Description
It resembles Atheris ceratophora, the Usambara bush viper. Atheris matildae is easily distinguished from all its congeners except for the A. ceratophora since they both have two to three enlarged hornlike structures above their eyes. A. matildae measures  in total length,  making it larger than A. ceratophora (the largest size ever recorded for A. ceratophora is 51.0 cm).

Conservation status
Matilda's horned viper occupies only a small area further threatened by logging and charcoal production.

Origin of name
Atheris matildae was named after Matilda, the daughter of Tim Davenport, the director of the Wildlife Conservation Society in Tanzania and a member of the three-person team to have discovered the snake.

References

matildae
Snakes of Africa
Reptiles of Tanzania
Endemic fauna of Tanzania
Reptiles described in 2011